Martin Albertz (7.5.1882, Halle, Saxony-Anhalt – 29.12.1956 in Berlin) was a German clergyman, resistance fighter, and teacher. As Superintendent of the deanery of Spandau within the Evangelical Church of the old-Prussian Union he—clinging to the Confessing Church—opposed the Nazis. He was imprisoned by the Nazis during the Second World War for his church activities.
He was the half-brother of theologian and politician Heinrich Albertz.

Further reading
 Friedrich Wilhelm Bautz: Albertz, Martin. In: Biographisch-Bibliographisches Kirchenlexikon (BBKL). Band 1, Bautz, Hamm 1975. 2., unveränderte Auflage Hamm 1990, Sp. 88.
 Peter Noss: Martin Albertz (1883 – 1956) – Eigensinn und Konsequenz: das Martyrium als Kennzeichen der Kirche im Nationalsozialismus. Neukirchen-Vluyn: Neukirchener 2001

External links
 Short biography/GdW

1882 births
1956 deaths
People from Halle (Saale)
German Protestant clergy